Malus or Malos, also known as Mallus or Mallos (Μάλλος), was a town of ancient Pisidia, inhabited during Roman and Byzantine times. It became a bishopric; no longer the seat of a residential bishop, it remains a titular see of the Roman Catholic Church.

Its site is located near Sarıidris, in Asiatic Turkey.

References

Populated places in Pisidia
Catholic titular sees in Asia
Former populated places in Turkey
Roman towns and cities in Turkey
Populated places of the Byzantine Empire
History of Isparta Province
Eğirdir District